Main Event Live is collaborative live album by Herb Alpert and Hugh Masekela. It was recorded in Los Angeles, California and released in 1978 via A&M Records label.

Reception
Richard Ginell of Allmusic stated: "'Let the good times roll,' Herb Alpert seemed to say as he quickly rejoined forces with Masekela for a follow-up LP to their first collaboration earlier that year. Recording live at the Roxy Theatre and on A&M's soundstage without duplicating anything on their earlier studio album, the two horn players (Alpert on trumpet, Masekela on flugelhorn) are, if anything, looser and more freewheeling than before. Though Alpert is not on quite as sure a jazz footing as Masekela, neither musician tries to blow the other out of the room. The band, containing only one holdover (guitarist Arthur Adams) from the first album, is more attuned to Latin funk/jazz with a South African tinge this time. Again, Alpert and Masekela have mostly fine tunes to work with, none better than 'Foreign Natives' and 'Shame the Devil' by African trombonist Mosa Jonas Gwangwa, plus Henry Sithole's wistfully haunting 'Mama Way' (which has chanted vocals and a string quartet). This album and its predecessor had the effect of recharging Alpert's music, though both are almost forgotten today".

A reviewer of Dusty Groove wrote "Masterful live set by Herb Alpert and Hugh Masekela – recorded at The Roxy in LA in 1978! Both their studio record from the same year and this massive live recording work incredibly well – as they're both geniuses and blending distinctive global influences – but they really cook in this live session in a way that's smoothed over a bit in the studio!"

Track listing

Personnel
David Williams - double bass, bass
Buddy Williams - drums
Hugh Masekela - flugelhorn
Arthur Adams, Jeff Sigman - guitar
Manolo Badrena - percussion
Larry Willis - piano, synthesizer, electric piano 
Jonas Mosa Gwangwa - trombone
Herb Alpert - trumpet

References

External links

1978 live albums
Herb Alpert albums
Hugh Masekela albums
Albums produced by Herb Alpert
A&M Records live albums
Collaborative albums
Albums recorded at the Roxy Theatre